Martinho Joaquim Castella Quessongo (born 7 February 1970) is an Angolan footballer. He played in 20 matches for the Angola national football team from 1994 and 1997. He was also named in Angola's squad for the 1996 African Cup of Nations tournament.

References

External links
 

1970 births
Living people
Angolan footballers
Angola international footballers
1996 African Cup of Nations players
Association football midfielders
People from Benguela